Sampoorna Ramayanam is a 1972 Indian Telugu-language Hindu mythological film directed by Bapu. It is based on Valmiki's Ramayana. The film was a commercial success.

Plot
The story is the complete Ramayana from the birth of Lord Rama to his Pattabhisheka after completing his exile.

Cast
 Shobhan Babu as Rama
 Nagaraju as Lakshmana
 Chandrakala as Sita
 Gummadi as Dasaratha
 V. Nagayya as Vasishtha
 Kaikala Satyanarayana as Meghanadha
 S. V. Ranga Rao as Ravana
 Krishna Kumari as Mandodari
 Mikkilineni as Janaka
 Jamuna as Kaika
 Chhaya Devi as Mandhara
 Dhulipala as Vibhishana
 Mukkamala as Parashurama
 Hemalatha as Kousalya
 Pandari Bai as Shabari 
 Chandra Mohan as Bharatha
 Arja Janardhan Rao as Anjaneya and Guha

Soundtrack
 "Adigo Ramayya"
 "Choosindhi Ninnu Choosindhi" (Singer: P. Susheela)
 "Evadu Ninnu Minchu Vaadu"
 "Kunukontini Etc" - P. Susheela, Ghantasala 
 "Oorike Kolanu Neeru Uliki Uliki Padutundhi" (Lyrics: Devulapalli Krishnasastri; Singer: P. Susheela)
 "Rama Laali Meghasyama Laali" (Singer: P. Susheela)
 "Ramaya Tandri O Ramaya Tandri.. Maa Nomulanni Pandinayi Ramaya Tandri" (Lyrics: Kosaraju Raghavaiah; Singer: Ghantasala)
 "Vana Jallu Kurisindhi Lera Lera Ollu Jhallu Jhallandi Rara Rara" (Singer: Jikki Krishnaveni)
 "Vedalenu Kodandapani" (three parts) (Singers: P. B. Srinivas and P. Susheela)

Box-office
The film ran for more than 100 days in 10 theaters in Andhra Pradesh.

References

External links
 

1972 films
Films directed by Bapu
Films based on the Ramayana
Films scored by K. V. Mahadevan
1970s Telugu-language films